The 2010 Goody's Fast Pain Relief 500 at Martinsville Speedway in Martinsville, Virginia was the sixth race of the 2010 NASCAR Sprint Cup Series season. It was scheduled to start at 1 p.m. EDT on March 28, 2010, but due to rain it ran on March 29, 2010 at 12 noon EDT. The 2010 Goody's Fast Pain Relief 500 was televised on Fox and was broadcast on MRN radio. This race was the first race that the spoiler replaced the wing on the Car of Tomorrow. The race had eight leaders, 26 lead changes, and 13 cautions.

Race report

Practices and qualifying

During the first practice on March 26, 2010 the fastest were Ryan Newman, Mark Martin, Marcos Ambrose, Jeff Gordon, and Denny Hamlin. There was no major contact during first practice except for between Tony Stewart and Travis Kvapil. Qualifying for the Martinsville race was canceled because of rain showers in the area which caused them to line-up by points. The pole-sitter was Kevin Harvick, and Casey Mears, Terry Cook, and Johnny Sauter did not qualify. During the second practice on March 27, 2010 the fastest were Mark Martin, Jeff Burton, Brian Vickers, Juan Pablo Montoya, and Jeff Gordon; there was no major contact in the practice. The faster cars in Happy Hour (the final practice) on March 27, 2010 were Jamie McMurray, Jeff Burton, Clint Bowyer, Jeff Gordon, and Denny Hamlin.

Race summary
The race was scheduled to start on Sunday, March 28, 2010, but rain delayed the event until noon EDT on Monday, March 29. The pre-race ceremonies began with Joey McNeil from Fort Trail Baptist Church saying the invocation. The Martinsville High School Jazz Band played the US national anthem, and Henry County administrator Benny Summerlin gave the command "Gentleman Start Your Engines'". Robby Gordon was sent to the back of the starting grid because he changed engines after Happy Hour. NASCAR announced before the race that there would be a competition caution  on lap 50. At 12:16 p.m., the green flag waved with Kevin Harvick the leader. Kevin Harvick stayed the leader until lap 41 when the first caution stopped the field because of a tire going down on Joe Nemechek's car. Since this caution came out near NASCAR's schedule competition caution on Lap 50, NASCAR canceled the competition caution. On lap 46, Kevin Harvick led to the green flag with Kurt Busch second. After a ten lap run, Jeff Gordon passed Kevin for the lead. Then on lap 63, David Stremme spun in turn four to bring out the second caution. Jeff Gordon, who stayed out of pit road, was still the leading when the green flag waved. Afterwards, on lap 75, David Reutimann spun in turn one to cause the third caution of the race. Jeff Gordon was still leading the race when race resumed, but a lap later Kurt Busch edged Jeff to lead lap 82. Then Jeff passed Kurt to lead again on lap 89.

After the lead change, the race experienced a run of 46 laps. During the laps, Kevin Harvick took his Chevrolet to the garage because of brake issues, and on lap 125 Juan Pablo Montoya collided into the wall; he went to the garage with major damage. The run ended because Robby Gordon, who  blew a tire, caused the fourth caution to be waved. After all of the lead lap cars pitted the leader was Jeff Gordon. On lap 140, Kurt Busch passed Jeff for the lead, but on lap 149 Jeff Burton passed Jeff and Kurt to get the lead. Thirteen laps later the fifth caution was given because Greg Biffle spun after having contact with Marcos Ambrose. During pit stops, Mark Martin stayed out to lead the field to the green flag on lap 168. On lap 170, the sixth caution was given because Elliott Sadler spun in turn four after contact with David Stremme.  On the restart the leader was Mark Martin. A lap later, Mark Martin was passed by Kurt Busch on the backstretch. After leading eight more laps, Kurt Busch was passed by Mark Martin for the lead. On lap 199, Kurt Busch was falling back while Jeff Burton passed Mark for the lead.

After the lead change on lap 199, most of the passing was from the back, but on lap 230 Denny Hamlin passed Jeff Burton for the lead. Four laps later the seventh yellow flag was given because Regan Smith and Robby Gordon couldn't get to pit road after getting in to the wall. On the restart, Denny Hamlin took the field to the green flag. Soon after, Jeff Burton passed Hamlin to lead again. On lap 264, Burton was leading by seven-tenths of a second. By lap 277, Burton was passed by Hamlin again.

On lap 303, the eighth caution came out as a result of Elliott Sadler spinning in turn two. Jeff Burton led them to the next green flag on lap 310. After five laps under green, the ninth caution came out because Marcos Ambrose had a tire deflating on his car. On lap 319, the green flag waved with Burton the leader. Jeff Burton battled Denny Hamlin for several laps until Hamlin passed for the lead on lap 358. Six laps later, the tenth caution came out because David Stremme spun in turn one. Denny Hamlin kept the lead after pit stops for the leaders were finished. Hamlin led 18 laps until Burton passed him back on lap 390. He kept the lead until Hamlin passed him on lap 405.

The eleventh caution was given because Kevin Conway got into the turn four wall. All of the lead lap cars pitted; Hamlin returned to the track as the leader. The green flag came out on lap 426 with the rest of the top-five being Jeff Burton, Kyle Busch, Clint Bowyer, and Matt Kenseth. On lap 429, Jamie McMurray received a black flag because the rear panel of his car coming loose. There was a long run of sixty-six laps after the eleventh caution, but the run ended because Jeff Burton's tire deflated causing the twelfth caution of the day. Under the caution, second place Kyle Busch and leader Hamlin went to pit road which gave Jeff Gordon the lead. The green flag was given on lap 498, but with a little more than one lap to go the thirteenth caution came out because Kyle Busch got sideways as a result of racing side by side with Paul Menard and Marcos Ambrose, causing a green-white-checker. After the caution the race extended passed the scheduled distance with the green flag on lap 506. On the restart, Denny Hamlin passed Ryan Newman while he was also passing Jeff Gordon. Then Matt Kenseth, who was the leader, was passed by Hamlin after being bumped by Jeff Gordon and overdriving the corner. On the checkered flag Denny Hamlin got his third win at Martinsville and his first of the year.

Race results
In conclusion, the race had 8 leaders, 26 lead changes, and 13 cautions for 79 laps. Denny Hamlin led the most laps by leading 171 of the 508 laps.

References

2010 in sports in Virginia
2010 NASCAR Sprint Cup Series
2010 Goody's Fast Pain Relief 500
March 2010 sports events in the United States